Kiggala Sewannaku Mukaabya Kasungubu (died 1494) was Kabaka of the Kingdom of Buganda. He reigned from 1434 until 1464 and from 1484 until 1494. He was the 5th Kabaka of Buganda.

Claim to the throne
He was the eldest son of Kabaka Ttembo Kiridde, Kabaka of Buganda, by his wife, Najjemba. He ascended to the throne upon the death of his father, around 1434. He established his capital at Kitala Hill. In 1464, he abdicated the throne in favor of his son, Ntege Kiyimba. Kiggala resumed the throne after the death of his son, sometime around 1484. He went blind shortly after the beginning of his second reign. He ruled under the regency of his prime ministers.

Married life

He married six wives as detailed below:

 Nabukalu, daughter of Natiigo, of the Lugave clan
 Nakawuka, daughter of Senfuma, of the Mamba clan
 Nakimera, daughter of Masembe, of the Nsenene clan
 Nakku, daughter of Walusimbi, of the Ffumbe clan
 Nakyobula, daughter of Mbajja, of the Mamba clan
 Nawampamba, daughter of Ggunju, of the Butiko clan

Issue

Kabaka Kiggala fathered nine recorded sons:

 Prince (Omulangira) Wasswa, whose mother was Princess Nazibanja
 Prince (Omulangira) Mawempe, whose mother was Princess Nazibanja
 Prince (Omulangira) Semugalwa, whose mother was Princess Nazibanja
 Prince (Omulangira) Bubula, whose mother was Princess Nazibanja
 Prince (Omulangira) Kaggya, whose mother was Princess Nazibanja
 Kabaka Kiyimba Ntege, Kabaka of Buganda, whose mother was Nabukalu
 Prince (Omulangira) Gogombe, whose mother was Nakyobula
 Prince (Omulangira) Kaasameeme, whose mother was Nakawuka
 Prince (Omulangira) Wampamba, whose mother was Nawampamba. He was excluded from the succession for committing incest with his aunt. Prince Wampamba married two wives (a) Lady Nakayima, daughter of his maternal uncle, Gunju, of the Butiko clan and (b) Lady Naabagereka, aunt and wet nurse to his first wife, sister of Gunju, of the Butiko clan. He fathered two sons:
 Kabaka Kayima Sendikaddiwa, the 7th Kabaka of Buganda, whose mother was Nakayima and
 Prince (Omulangira) Kyabayinze, whose mother was Naabagereka. Prince Kyabayinze fathered one son:
 Prince (Omulangira) Juma who unsuccessfully contested the succession with his cousin, Kabaka Nakibinge.

The final years
Kabaka Kiggala Mukaabya Sewannaku Kasungubu died in 1494 of extreme old age and was succeeded on the throne by his grandson, Kayima Sendikaddiwa. His remains are buried at Ddambwe, Busiro.

Succession table 1st time

Succession table 2nd time

See also
Kabaka of Buganda

External links
List of the Kings of Buganda

Kabakas of Buganda
15th-century monarchs in Africa
1494 deaths
Year of birth unknown